The Potomac Heritage Trail, also known as the Potomac Heritage National Scenic Trail or the PHT, is a designated National Scenic Trail corridor spanning parts of the mid-Atlantic region of the United States that will connect various trails and historic sites in Virginia, Maryland, Pennsylvania, and the District of Columbia. The trail network includes  of existing and planned sections, tracing the natural, historical, and cultural features of the Potomac River corridor, the upper Ohio River watershed in Pennsylvania and western Maryland, and a portion of the Rappahannock River watershed in Virginia. The trail is managed by the National Park Service and is one of three National Trails that are official NPS units.

Unlike many long-distance hiking trails such as the Appalachian Trail, the Potomac Heritage Trail is an informal route with numerous side trails and alternatives, some in parallel on each side of the river. Currently, many of these are separate, connected to the others only by roads. The PHT crosses the Appalachian Trail near Harpers Ferry, West Virginia, and is concurrent with the American Discovery Trail along the portion of the C&O Canal Towpath between Oldtown, Maryland, and Washington, D.C.

Initial sections 
Three substantial sections of the trail were in existence when the Potomac Heritage Trail officially became a National Scenic Trail in 1983. These trails range from hiking-only to multi-use, illustrating the variety of the PHT route.

The Chesapeake and Ohio Canal Towpath, which runs  along the Maryland side of the Potomac River between Georgetown in Washington, D.C., and Cumberland, Maryland.
The Mount Vernon Trail in Virginia, which runs  between Rosslyn and Mount Vernon, parallel to the Potomac River.

Completed and planned sections 
Upon its completion, the Potomac Heritage Trail will consist of the following sections:

 The  Laurel Highlands Hiking Trail, within Laurel Ridge State Park in Pennsylvania.
 A  section of the Great Allegheny Passage (GAP), between Cumberland, Maryland and Ohiopyle, Pennsylvania.
 The  C&O Canal Towpath within the Chesapeake and Ohio Canal National Historical Park, in Maryland, and Washington, D.C.
 A  linear park system in Loudoun County, Virginia.
  of trails within Riverbend Park, Great Falls Park, and Scott's Run Nature Preserve in Fairfax County, Virginia.
 Two partially completed routes within the District of Columbia – the  Fort Circle Parks Trail, part of the Civil War Defenses of Washington, and a multi-use route between Georgetown and Oxon Cove Park.
 The paved shared use  Mount Vernon Trail and a   gravel trail in and around Arlington and Alexandria, Virginia, mostly alongside the George Washington Memorial Parkway.
 The  Alexandria Heritage Trail in Alexandria, Virginia.
 A  biking trail in Prince George's County, Maryland.
 A  trail in Piscataway Park in Prince George's County, Maryland.
 A  route within the Nanjemoy Natural Resource Management Area in Charles County, Maryland.
 A biking trail in Charles and St. Mary's counties in Maryland.
 Two  routes in Prince William Forest Park and a partially completed  route, between Leesylvania State Park and Belmont Bay, in Prince William County, Virginia.
 The Government Island Trail, the planned  Historic Falmouth-Ferry Farm Trail, and the Aquia Creek Water Trail, all in Stafford County, Virginia.
 The Northern Neck Heritage Trail Bicycling Route Network in Westmoreland, Northumberland, Lancaster, and Richmond counties, all in Virginia.

References

External links

Trails/Parks of PHNST
 Great Allegheny Passage
 C&O Canal Bicycling Guide
 Mt. Vernon Trail, Arlington/Alexandria/Mt Vernon, VA
 Great Falls Park, MD/VA
 Riverbend Park, Great Falls, VA
 Algonkian Park, VA
 Red Rock Wilderness Regional Park, VA
 Balls Bluff Regional Park, VA
 Occoquan Regional Park, VA
 Laurel Hill Greenway, Lorton, VA
 Prince William Forest Park, VA
 Leesylvania State Park, VA
 Piscataway Park/Trail, MD
 Fort Foote Park, MD

Groups
 Potomac Heritage Trail
 National Park Service site
 Potomac Heritage Trail Association
 C&O Canal Association
 Allegheny Trail Alliance
 Oxon Hill Bicycle and Trail Club
 Southern Prince George's Trail Coalition
 Great Falls Trail Blazers
 Fairfax Trails and Streams
 Potomac Appalachian Trail Club
 Friends of Dahlgren Heritage Rail Trail, King George Co, Virginia
 Accokeek Foundation

National Scenic Trails of the United States
Hiking trails in Maryland
Hiking trails in Virginia
Hiking trails in Pennsylvania
Parks in Washington, D.C.
Long-distance trails in the United States
National Park Service areas in Maryland
National Park Service areas in Virginia
National Park Service areas in Pennsylvania
National Park Service areas in Washington, D.C.
Units of the National Landscape Conservation System
Protected areas of Maryland
Protected areas of Virginia
Heritage trails